Ned Bellamy (born May 7, 1957) is an American actor.

Early life and education
Bellamy was educated at UCLA. His brother, Mark Bellamy, was the United States Ambassador to Kenya from 2003 until 2006.

Career
After graduating from UCLA, Bellamy founded the Los Angeles-based theater company The Actors' Gang with fellow actor Tim Robbins.

Bellamy has appeared in numerous films and television series, including Scrubs, Treme, 24, Chicago P.D., Justified, Criminal Minds, Gotham, and Paradise City. He portrayed the Reverend Lester Coggins in the first season of the CBS adaptation of Stephen King's Under the Dome.

Bellamy became a fan-favorite on an episode of Seinfeld, portraying Eddie, Julia Louis-Dreyfus’ army veteran co-writer in "The Fatigues". His television career began with another veteran — Paul, an American-born German soldier, in the final season of The Waltons.

Bellamy played Wilson in Quentin Tarantino’s seventh film, Django Unchained. In 2021, he appeared as Ross on the Amazon Prime series Paradise City.

Filmography

Film

Television

References

External links

American male film actors
American male television actors
Living people
Male actors from Dayton, Ohio
UCLA Film School alumni
1957 births